Grand Duke Michael Nikolaevich of Russia (25 October 1832 –  18 December 1909) was the fourth son and seventh child of Emperor Nicholas I of Russia and Charlotte of Prussia.  He was the first owner of the New Michael Palace on the Palace Quay in Saint Petersburg.

Marriage and issue
On 16 August 1857, he married Princess Cecilie of Baden (1839–1891), daughter of Leopold, Grand Duke of Baden and Sophie of Sweden. Cecily adopted the name Olga Feodorovna, and had the following children with him:

Career 

He served 20 years (1862–1882) as the Governor General of Caucasia, being seated in Tbilisi, the town which most of his children remembered as the home of their childhood. In the Russo-Turkish War (1877-1878), he was nominal Commander-in-Chief of the Russian troops in the Caucasus and was appointed Field Marshal General in April 1878.

In the course of his life, four members of his family ruled as Emperors of Russia: his father, Nicholas I; his brother, Alexander II; his nephew, Alexander III; as well as his grand-nephew, Nicholas II, whose second daughter, Grand Duchess Tatiana, the Grand Duke was godfather to.

He died in Cannes, France, on 18 December 1909. He was the last surviving legitimate grandchild of Paul I of Russia.

Honours
National orders and decorations
 Knight of St. Andrew, 1832
 Knight of St. Alexander Nevsky, 1832
 Knight of the White Eagle, 1832
 Knight of St. Anna, 1st Class, 1832
 Knight of St. George, 4th Class, July 1854; 2nd Class, February 1864; 1st Class, September 1877
 Knight of St. Vladimir, 1st Class, January 1863
 Golden Saber "For Bravery", 1863; Golden Sword "For the conquest of the Caucasus", in Diamonds and Emeralds, February 1864
 Knight of St. Stanislaus, 1st Class, November 1865

Foreign orders and decorations

Ancestors

References

1832 births
1909 deaths
19th-century people from the Russian Empire
20th-century Russian people
People from Petergof
People from Petergofsky Uyezd
Russian grand dukes
House of Holstein-Gottorp-Romanov
Field marshals of Russia
Members of the State Council (Russian Empire)
Russian military personnel of the Caucasian War
Caucasus Viceroyalty (1801–1917)
1870s in Georgia (country)
Russian people of the Russo-Turkish War (1877–1878)
Emigrants from the Russian Empire to France
Recipients of the Order of the White Eagle (Russia)
Recipients of the Order of St. Anna, 1st class
Recipients of the Order of St. Vladimir, 1st class
Recipients of the Order of St. George of the First Degree
Recipients of the Order of St. George of the Second Degree
Recipients of the Order of St. George of the Fourth Degree
Recipients of the Pour le Mérite (military class)
Recipients of the Order of the Netherlands Lion
Grand Crosses of the Order of Saint Stephen of Hungary
Grand Croix of the Légion d'honneur
People of the Caucasian War
Children of Nicholas I of Russia
Sons of emperors
Circassian genocide perpetrators
Burials at Saints Peter and Paul Cathedral, Saint Petersburg